{{Infobox military unit
|unit_name= 7th Algerian Tirailleur Regiment
| image=7e Régiment de Tirailleurs Algériens, type 3.jpg
| image_size = 250
|caption= Regimental insignia
|dates= 1913–1964
|country= France 
|allegiance=
|branch= French Army
|type= Tirailleurs 
|role=
|size=
|command_structure=
|garrison=
|equipment=

|current_commander=
|ceremonial_chief=
|colonel_of_the_regiment=
|notable_commanders=

|identification_symbol=
|identification_symbol_2=

|nickname=
|patron=
|motto= " La victoire ou la mort " (Victory or Death)
|colors=
|march=
|mascot=
|battles= World War IWorld War IIIndochina War
|anniversaries=
|decorations=
|battle_honours=
Artois 1915
Champagne 1915
Verdun 1915
Soissonnais 1918
Picardy 1918
Aisne 1918
Levant 1920–1921
Morocco 1925–1926
Fondouk El Okbi (Tunisia) 1943
Rome 1944
Marseille 1944
Vosges 1944
Indochina 1947–1954
AFN 1952–1962
}}

The 7th Algerian Tirailleurs Regiment was an infantry unit of the French Army, part of the Army of Africa.

Active between 1913 and 1946, the unit is one of the most decorated of the French Army. The regiment distinguished itself in World War I, when the unit was cited six times at the orders of the armed forces and awarded the Légion d'honneur. During World War II, it was part of the 3rd Algerian Infantry Division (3e DIA), notably in the Italian campaign with the French Expeditionary Corps of General Alphonse Juin, and was cited three times at the orders of the armed forces

Dissolved in 1964, the regiment became the 170th Infantry Regiment.

 Creation and names 
 1913: creation of the 7th Marching Tirailleurs Regiment, (7e RMT).
 1919: named the 7th Algerian Tirailleurs Regiment, (7e RTA).
 1962: designated 7th Tirailleurs Regiment.
 1964: dissolved 1 July and re-formed as the 170th Infantry Regiment.

History
 World War I 
The 2nd battalion of the regiment remained in North Africa. It was part of the Moroccan Division and fought alongside the Marching Regiment of the Foreign Legion, the 4th Tunisian Tirailleurs Regiment and the 8th Zouaves Regiment.

 1914 
 Deployment of the IIIrd and IVth Army on the Marne
 5–13 September: First Battle of the Marne
 First Battle of Ypres:
 Bois Triangulaire
 12 November: North of Ypres

 1915 
 28 January: Flanders: Grande Dune near Nieuport
 Second Battle of Artois:
 Cote 140
 9 May: Vimy Ridge
 25 September – 6 October: Second Battle of Champagne
 Butte de Souains
 25 September: Bois Sabot

1916
 4 July: Battle of the Somme: Belloy-en-Santerre

1917

 17 April: Mont-sans-Nom, Auberive
 Verdun

1918
 26 April: Villers-Bretonneux, Bois du Hangard
 29 May – 1 June: , Missy-aux-Bois, Chaudun
 12 June: Amblémy
 Saint-Pierre-Aigle, Daumiers
 July 1918: Chaudun
 28 August – 17 September: Tunnel of Vauxaillon, Neuville-sous-Marginal

 Casualties 
From 1914 to 1918, losses for the 7th Marching Tirailleurs Regiment were: 2326 killed or missing (97 officers, 232 junior officers, 260 corporals and 1737 soldiers).

Throughout this war, the 7th Regiment collectively obtained 31 citations and 464 medals.

 Interwar period 
In 1928, the 7e RTA adopted the designation of 11e RTA then went back to 7e RTA. In 1936, the 7e RTA was garrisoned at Constantine, Algeria.

World War II 
 Composition of the regiment 
During the Second World War, one North-African tirailleur regiment consisted of a little more than 3000 men (of which 500 officers and junior officers) and 200 vehicles. The proportion of Maghrebis reached 69% for the regiment, 74% for the battalion, 79% for the company of fusiliers-voltigeurs, 52% for the anti-tank company and 36% for the cannon infantry company.

 Campaigns 
 1939: part of the 83e DIA
 1943: belonged to the 3rd Algerian Infantry Division
 January to May 1944: Battle of Monte Cassino
 August 1944: disembarkation at Provence, liberation of Toulon and Marseille
 Fall – winter 1944: Alps, Jura, Alsace, Vosges, capture of Mulhouse and the defense of Strasbourg

 Collective citations 
Throughout the course of the Second World War, the 7e RTA obtained ten collective citations at the orders of the armed forces (three for the regiment, four for battalions, and three for companies).

 Casualties 
The 3rd Algerian Infantry Division 3e DIA recorded 809 killed in action in the 7th RTA from November 1942 to May 1945, of whom 614 were Maghrebis (75%) and 195 Europeans (25%).

 Indochina War 
Four marching battalions were constituted successively to fight in the First Indochina War, which included the heavy usage of colonial forces.
The 5th Marching Battalion (V/7e RTA), under chief of battalion Roland de Mecquenem, was at the Battle of Dien Bien Phu during the Gabrielle resistance. After a heavy artillery bombardment they retreated from the Viet Minh's 308th Infantry Division.

 Algerian War 
The 7e RTA fought in the Algerian War, in the corps of the 21st Infantry Division, in the sector of Aurès Nemencha. At the cease-fire on 19 March 1962, the regiment constituted along with 91 other regiments, a local unit force of the Algerian order of battle, the 427 UFL-UFO composed of 10% of metropolitan military and 90% of Muslim military personnel at Barika, during the transition period, while being at the service of the executive provisionary power of Algeria until the independence of Algeria (Evian Accords, 18 March 1962).

Following that, the regiment was back in France in 1962, and garrisoned until 1964, when the unit was dissolved to form the 170th Infantry Regiment.

 Traditions 
 Regimental colors 

 Decorations 
The regimental colors are decorated with:

 Légion d'honneur (1919):
 Cited for the First World War
 Croix de guerre 1914–1918 with:
 Six palms one vermeil star
 Croix de guerre 1939-1945 with:
 Three palms
 Croix de guerre des théâtres d'opérations extérieures with:
 Three palms (One for the Levant, one for Indochina and one for Morocco)
  
 Fourragère:
 Colors of the Légion d'honneur with olives of the colors of the croix de guerre 1939–1945

The regiment was the first indigenous to be awarded the fourragère with the colors of the Croix de la Légion d'honneur (1914–1918).

 Battle Honours 
Artois 1915
Champagne 1915
Verdun 1915
Soissonnais 1918
Picardy 1918
Aisne 1918
Levant 1920–1921
Morocco 1925–1926
Fondouk El Okbi 1943
Rome 1944
Marseille 1944
Vosges 1944
Indochina 1947–1954
AFN 1952–1962

 Regimental commanders 
 Lt-Colonel Fellert: August 1914 – September 1914
 Lt-Colonel Levêque: October 1914 – December 1914
 Cdt Jacquot: December 1914 – January 1915
 Lt-Colonel Demetz: January 1915 – February 1916
 Lt-Colonel Schuhler: February 1916 – May 1916
 Lt-Colonel Schultz: May 1916 – May 1918
 Lt-Colonel Mensier: June 1918

 Regimental Commanders
 1913 – 1914: Colonel Mathieu
 1914 – 1916: Lt-Colonel Laurent
 1916 – 1916: Lt-Colonel Demaris
 1916 – 1916: Lt-Colonel Delom
 1916 – 1917: Cdt Pimont
 1917 – 1918: Lt-Colonel Felici
 1918 – 1918: Cdt Conneau
 1918 – 1918: Lt-Colonel Vaissières
 1918 – 1918: Colonel Fropo
 1918 – 1919: Colonel Lamiable
 1919 – 1920: Lt-Colonel Fadat
 1920 – 1920: Cdt de Font Reaulx
 1920 – 1920: Cdt Diard
 1920 – 1920: Lt-Colonel Fadat
 1920 – 1920: Cdt Diard
 1920 – 1920: Cdt de Font Reaulx
 1920 – 1924: Colonel Lemaître
 1924 – 1928: Colonel Pidaud
 1928 – 1930: Colonel Pichon
 1930 – 1933: Colonel de Tassy de Montluc
 1933 – 1937: Colonel Watrin
 1937 – 1940: Colonel Richard
 1940 – 1942: Colonel Cortot
 1942 – 1943: Colonel Regnault
 1943 – 1944: Colonel Chappuis
 1944 – 1944: Lt-Colonel Pichot
 1944 – 1945: Colonel Goutard
 1945 – 1947: Colonel Lardin
 1947 – 1948: Colonel Allard
 1948 – 1950: Colonel Du Passage
 1950 – 1952: Colonel Costantini
 1952 – 1954: Colonel Derville
 1954 – 1956: Colonel Arfouilloux
 1956 – 1958: Colonel de Raffin de la Raffinie
 1958 – 1960: Colonel Chevallier
 1960 – 1961: Colonel Ahmed Rafa
 1961: Colonel Breil

 Honorary arms particular to the regiment 
 Combats of 9 May 1915 in Artois.
 Combats of 25 September 1915 in Champagne.
 Combats of 20 August 1917 at Verdun.
 Combats of April 1918 in the Somme.
 Combats of 29 to 31 May and 18 to 20 July in Aisne.
 Combats of 2 September to September 1918 in the Aisne.
 Combats of 17 April 1917 in Champagne.

 Officers and Tirailleurs 
General Jacques Schmitt (1919–2005), volunteer in 1941. Twelve citations, commander of the Légion d'honneur.

 See also 
3rd Algerian Tirailleurs Regiment

References

Bibliography
 Les Africains, Historama, hors-série n° 10, 1970
 Anthony Clayton, Histoire de l'Armée française en Afrique 1830–1962, Albin Michel, 1994
 L'Armée d'Afrique: 1830–1962, Charles-Lavauzelle, 1977
 De Sétif à Marseille, par Cassino, (Preface by General Jean Delaunay – commentary by Colonel Henri Ortholan) Editions Anovi 2007
 General Jacques Schmitt, Journal d'un officier de Tirailleurs (1944)'' (Preface by Colonel Ortholan), Editions Bernard Giovanangeli, 2010.

External links 

Tirailleurs regiments of France
Armée d’Afrique
20th-century regiments of France
Military units and formations established in 1919
Military units and formations disestablished in 1964